Gjesteby is a Norwegian surname. Notable people with the surname include:

 Kari Gjesteby (born 1947), Norwegian politician, daughter of Omar
 Omar Gjesteby (1899–1979), Norwegian trade unionist and politician

Norwegian-language surnames